Mamta Chandrakar (born 3 December 1958) is a Padma Shri Awarded folk singer of Chhattisgarh. She is referred to as the Nightingale of Chhattisgarh. Mamta Chandrakar has her post graduation degree in singing from Indira Kala Sangeet Vishwavidyalaya. Mamta Chandrakar has started singing from the age of 10 years and professionally took it as folk singer in 1977 with Aakashvani Kendra Raipur. She is a Padmashree Awardee in 2016 for her work, she has bagged several other state-level awards. Her husband Prem Chandrakar is a producer and director in Chhollywood.

Early life
Mamta Chandrakar was born in the year 1958 to Mr. Dau Maha Singh Chandrakar who himself had deep knowledge of folk music. The time when Bollywood music was influencing the local folk music, he started a company called "Sonha-Bihan" in 1974. Sonha-Bihan was aimed to keep the soul of folk music alive in people's hearts and minds. With this thought Sonha-Bihan performed in front of forty to fifty thousand people in March 1974. Late Dau Maha Singh dedicated his whole life to promote the folk music. Mamta Chandrakar took her early lessons from her father himself. She then enrolled in Indira Kala Sangeet Vishwavidyalaya for further studies in music. In 1986, she married Prem Chandrakar, a director and producer of Chhattisgarhi Cinema. The couple had a daughter in 1988.

Awards
 2023 Sangeet Natak Akademi Award
 2019 Chhattisgarh Vibhuti Alankaran 
 2016 Padma Shri Award 
 2013 Chhattisgarh Ratna 
 2012 Dau Dular Singh Mandraji Honours

References

Living people
1958 births
Recipients of the Padma Shri in arts
Indian women folk singers
Indian folk singers
Singers from Chhattisgarh
People from Raipur, Chhattisgarh
People from Chhattisgarh
Musicians from Chhattisgarh
Women musicians from Chhattisgarh
20th-century Indian women singers
20th-century Indian singers
21st-century Indian singers
21st-century Indian women singers
Chhattisgarh MLAs 2018–2023
Recipients of the Sangeet Natak Akademi Award
Chhattisgarhi-language singers